Arpafeelie is a hamlet on the Black Isle, in Ross and Cromarty, in the Highland council area of Scotland. It is situated 4 km north-west of the village of North Kessock, and 8 km north-west of the city of Inverness. The A9 road, the main road north from Inverness, passes by to the east of Arpafeelie.

It is the location of St John's Church, part of the Scottish Episcopal Church. Completed in 1816, St John's is the oldest church in the diocese of Moray, Ross and Caithness.

References

Populated places on the Black Isle